Ariel VI, known pre-launch as UK-6, was a British and American satellite launched in 1979 as part of the Ariel programme. It was operated by the Science Research Council, which became the Science and Engineering Research Council in 1981. Ariel VI was used for astronomical research and provided data until February 1982. It was the last Ariel satellite to be launched.

Satellite design

Operations

Sensors
The primary experiment, the cosmic ray detector, could sense heavy cosmic rays with an atomic number over 30. The  diameter acrylic-lined aluminum sphere was filled with a gaseous oxygen, nitrogen, and helium mixture. Heavy cosmic rays penetrated the sphere and excited the gas to produce scintillation light; the acrylic produced Cerenkov radiation. These ultraviolet emissions were detected with 16 photo-multipliers. Data processing to separate the two different types of ultraviolet emissions was performed by comparing the brightness and duration of the emissions. The amplitude of the signal was used to determine the atomic number of the cosmic ray. Unlike the X-ray experiments, this experiment had no pointing requirements other than what was required for thermal control.

The two other experiments were X-ray telescopes. One detected low-energy X-rays and the other high-energy X-rays.

Mission

Launch
A Scout D-1 carrier rocket (SN S198C) was used to launch Ariel VI from Launch Area 3A at the Wallops Flight Center. The launch was successfully conducted at 23:26:00 UTC on 2 June 1979. Once the satellite achieved orbit it was renamed from UK-6 to Ariel 6.

Operations
Ariel 6 operated in a  low Earth orbit, at an inclination of 55.0° and with an orbital period of 97.22 minutes as of 15 July 1979. The satellite provided data until February 1982. It decayed from orbit and reentered the atmosphere on 23 September 1990.

Results
Interference from radar signals prevented the satellite from pointing correctly, and affected the data that it returned.

Notes

References

External links
 Ariel VI Measurements of Ultra-Heavy Cosmic Ray Fluxes in the Region 34 ≤ Z ≤ 48

1979 in spaceflight
Space programme of the United Kingdom
Satellites formerly orbiting Earth
Spacecraft launched in 1979